The A10 Highway is a primary road that runs from Ngundu in south Masvingo Province to Tanganda through the Mutare-Masvingo Highway in Manicaland Province.

Background

The A10 Highway also called the P5 Highway
begins at where Cashel/Chimanimani Road turns off from the A9 Highway which runs from Mutare to Masvingo. 
It ends at Ngundu in Masvingo Province where it makes a T-junction with the A4 Highway running from Harare to Beitbridge.  

Locals in Manicaland like to call it Chimanimani Road and after Chimanimani Turn off they call it Tanganda Road and further on they call it Chiredzi Road. Those around Ngundu call it Chiredzi Road and past Chiredzi turn-off they call it Save Road, Tanganda Road and finally Mutare Road.

Junctions

(Direction: North to South.)

 Cashel Turn-off. Cashel Road continues straight ahead while A10 turns right. 
 Chimanimani Turn-off. Chimanimani Road proper turns left here. 
 Chipinga Turn-off. Here the road straight ahead is to Chipinga which is the A16 Highway.

The A10 Highway turns right to merge with the A16 Highway. 

 Tanganda Turn-off. Here the A10 Highway turns sharp left from the merge with the A16 Highway. The A16 continues straight on for 22.3 km to the junction with the A9 Highway east of Birchenough Bridge. 

 Chiredzi. Chiredzi Turn-off is 169 km from A16 Tanganda Turn-off.  Here the municipal "Inyati Drive" branches left from the A10 and runs approximately 3 km into Chiredzi.

Major Bridges

 Save River. 
 Mutirikwi River. 
 Chiredzi River.

Toll Gates

The road is tolled at Toll Plaza number "35" between the 
70.5-71.5 km peg, 9 km before Triangle.

See also

 A4 Highway
 A9 Highway
 A16 Highway
 ZINARA
 Transport in Zimbabwe

References

Roads in Zimbabwe